Credenhill railway station first opened on 30 June 1863 and finally closed by the Western Region of British Railways on 31 December 1962. The site is now used for Credenhill's Sports and Social Club, owned by the local council.

Construction and early operations
The section of line between Hereford and Moorhampton opened for goods traffic on 24 October 1862, with the section to Eardisley following on 30 June 1863. Further extensions of the line reached Hay-on-Wye on 11 July 1864 and Three Cocks Junction on 1 September 1864. Passenger train service from the HH&BR's Moorfields station in Hereford to Eardisley commenced on 30 June 1863 and passenger traffic to Hay began on 11 July 1864. The line extension to Brecon was opened for goods traffic on 1 September 1864 and for passenger trains on 21 September 1864.

Notes

References

Further reading

Midland Railway
Railway stations in Great Britain opened in 1863
Railway stations in Great Britain closed in 1962
Disused railway stations in Herefordshire
1863 establishments in England
Former Midland Railway stations